Zarnak Sidhwa (born 15 December 1972) is a Pakistani chef and chocolatier. She is featured in Hum Masala TV show Food Diaries, and used to be a part of Chocoholics.

She is the daughter in law of Pakistan's Supreme Court's Justice Rustam S. Sidhwa. She belongs to Parsi community of Karachi.

References

Living people
1972 births
Pakistani television chefs
Pakistani television hosts
Women chefs
Parsi people
Pakistani Zoroastrians
Chocolatiers
Pakistani women television presenters